Turtle Rock may refer to:
Turtle Rock, Irvine, California
Turtle Rock Elementary School, an elementary school in southern Irvine, California
Turtle Rock Light is a lighthouse on the Schuylkill River near Philadelphia, Pennsylvania.
Turtle Rock Studios, an independent video game developer founded in March 2002 by Michael Booth
"Turtle Rock", a song by Béla Fleck and the Flecktones from their 1991 album Flight of the Cosmic Hippo
Turtle Rock, a small island in Erebus Bay, Antarctica